Gabriela Sabatini was the defending champion, but lost in the quarterfinal to Amanda Coetzer.

Steffi Graf won the title, defeating Conchita Martínez in the final, 3–6, 6–2, 6–0.

Seeds 
The top eight seeds received a bye to the second round.

Draw

Finals

Top half

Section 1

Section 2

Bottom half

Section 1

Section 2

References

External links 
  ITF tournament edition details

Virginia Slims of Florida
Virginia Slims of Florida
Virginia Slims of Florida
Virginia Slims of Florida
Virginia Slims of Florida